The 1958 Stanley Cup Finals was the championship series of the National Hockey League's (NHL) 1957–58 season, and the culmination of the 1958 Stanley Cup playoffs. It was contested between the two-time defending champion Montreal Canadiens and the Boston Bruins in a rematch of the 1957 Finals. The Canadiens, who were appearing in the Finals for the eighth consecutive year, won the series, four games to two, for their third straight Cup victory and tenth in the team's history.

Paths to the Finals
Montreal defeated the Detroit Red Wings 4–0, and Boston defeated the New York Rangers 4–2, to reach the Finals.

Game summaries
Montreal captain Maurice "Rocket" Richard led the playoff goal-scoring race with 11. In Game 5, he notched his sixth career playoff overtime goal (three of which occurred in this and previous Stanley Cup Finals).

Stanley Cup engraving
The 1958 Stanley Cup was presented to Canadiens captain Maurice Richard by NHL President Clarence Campbell following the Canadiens 5–3 win over the Bruins in game six.

The following Canadiens players and staff had their names engraved on the Stanley Cup

1957–58 Montreal Canadiens

Engraving notes 
Every player whose name was engraved on the Stanley Cup in 1957 also appeared on the Cup in 1958, the only time this had occurred in NHL history for repeat champions. In addition, four players' names appeared on the Cup in 1958 that were not present in 1957: Charlie Hodge, Ab MacDonald, Marcel Bonin and Albert Langlois. The only other change was in the name of the owner, as Hartland Molson had taken over the Canadiens from William Northey and Donat Raymond. Thirteen names on the 1958 Cup are those of members of Hockey Hall of Fame: players Jean Beliveau, Bernie Geoffrion, Doug Harvey, Tom Johnson, Dickie Moore, Bert Olmstead, Jacques Plante, Henri Richard and Maurice Richard, and non-players Hartland Molson, Ken Reardon, Frank Selke Sr. and Hector 'Toe' Blake.

In 1958 NHL decided to change the look the Stanley Cup again. The new-look Stanley Cup to be full in 1992 for the Stanley Cup 100th anniversary. The Stanley Cup bowl renamed the same with 1903 to 1906 winning teams listed on the bowl, along with Paddy Moran, Fred Taylor and several installs. Inside the bowl included both 1907 Kenora Thistles, 1907 Wanderers, plus 20 members of Wanderers. Also included are 9 members of 1915 Vancouver, BC and Harry Broadbent.
Underneath are 6 small rings or bands. They included teams winning members names from 1924 to 1927, and 1929. The winning team names only from 1893 to 1902, & 1909 to 1918, but missing 1908-10 Montreal Wanderers & 1911 Ottawa Senators but that ring included 3 non-winners. 1915 NHA Champion Ottawa, 1916 PCHA Champion Portland, 1918 PCHA Champion Vancouver 
A Shoulder sits between the smaller and larger rings. It includes all the Stanley Cup-winning team names from 1893 to 1992. This including 7 teams that did not put their team name on it and unfinished 1919 Stanley Cup Finals. (1908 Montreal Wanderers, 1910 Montreal Wanderers, 1911 Ottawa Senators, 1918 Toronto Arenas, 1919 No Decision Montreal Canadiens Seattle Metropolitans, 1920 Ottawa Senators, 1921 Ottawa Senators, 1922 Toronto St. Pats, and 1923 Ottawa Senators.)
There were 5 larger rings under the shoulder to included 13 winning seasons per ring. Ring 1 1928 to 1940, ring 2 1941 to 1953, ring 1954 to 1958 with more teams to be added to ring 3 (1957 Montreal Canadiens team were finally added in 1958). Ring 3 and Ring 4 were blank. The last ring to be filled in 1992 for the Stanley Cup 100th anniversary. All the rings below the shoulder are now identical in size. The Cup remained the same height 34 1/4 inches and 35 1/2 pounds. 
1928 Boston Bruins team members were engraved twice (members missing from both engravings) on a smaller band with 1927 Ottawa Senators and on first of the large rings. 1915 Vancouver Millionaires team was listed 3 times. Once on the shoulder, Once on one of the smaller bands (rings), and inside the cup with team name and 9 winning members.
_The new larger rings were not engraved the same as the previous rings. Some names were added, others missing, many first names/positions were spelt differently, and most spelling mistakes were fixed.
-Note the Stanley Cup has not changed size or shape since 1958. (See 1992 Stanley Cup Finals for the next change in the Stanley Cup engraving plates.)

See also
 1957–58 Boston Bruins season
 1957–58 Montreal Canadiens season
 1957–58 NHL season

References

 Podnieks, Andrew; Hockey Hall of Fame (2004). Lord Stanley's Cup. Bolton, Ont.: Fenn Pub. pp 12, 50. 

Stanley Cup
Stanley Cup Finals
Boston Bruins games
Montreal Canadiens games
Stanley Cup Finals
1950s in Montreal
1958 in Quebec
Ice hockey competitions in Boston
Stanley Cup Finals
1950s in Boston
Ice hockey competitions in Montreal
1958 in Canadian sports